Homodihydrocapsaicin is a capsaicinoid and analog and congener of capsaicin in  chili peppers (Capsicum). Like capsaicin it is an irritant. Homodihydrocapsaicin accounts for about 1% of the total capsaicinoids mixture and has about half the pungency of capsaicin. Pure homodihydrocapsaicin is a lipophilic colorless odorless crystalline to waxy compound. It produces "numbing burn" in the throat and is  one of the most prolonged and difficult to rinse out. On the Scoville scale it has 8,600,000 SHU (Scoville heat units).

See also 
 Capsaicin
 Dihydrocapsaicin
 Nordihydrocapsaicin
 Homocapsaicin
 Nonivamide
 Scoville scale
 Pepper spray
 Spice

References

External links 
 Molecule of the Month

Capsaicinoids
Acetamides